The American Athletic Conference Football Championship Game is a college football game currently held by the American Athletic Conference (The American) each year to determine the conference's season champion. The inaugural game was held on December 5, 2015, at 12:00 pm ET.

The game previously pitted the champion of the Eastern Division (UCF, Cincinnati, Connecticut, East Carolina, South Florida, and Temple) against the champion of the Western Division (Houston, Memphis, Navy, SMU, Tulane, and Tulsa). The game was played at the home stadium of the division winner with the better conference record.

In 2020, UConn left the conference, leading to the dissolution of the divisions. Because of new NCAA rules regarding conference championships, the game has become a matchup between the top two teams in the conference.

Television broadcast rights to the game are owned by ESPN on ABC.

History

The American  was reorganized following the tumultuous period of realignment that hobbled the Big East between 2010 and 2013. In all, 14 member schools announced their departure for other conferences, and 15 other schools announced plans to join the conference (eight as all-sports members, and four for football only). In December 2012, the Big East's seven remaining non-FBS schools, all Catholic institutions – DePaul, Georgetown, Marquette, Providence, St. John's, Seton Hall, and Villanova – announced that they voted unanimously to leave the conference.

After a settlement in 2013 between the non-FBS schools and the FBS schools regarding the use of the conference name, the ten remaining football playing members renamed themselves the American Athletic Conference. In 2014, Louisville and Rutgers departed the conference and joined the ACC and Big Ten, respectively. Their departure was succeeded on the same day by the entrance of East Carolina, Tulane, and Tulsa for all sports. In 2015, the U.S. Naval Academy joined the conference for football, bringing the membership total in that sport to twelve teams. At which time, the conference split into two six-team divisions and established a football conference championship game.

On July 1, 2020 UConn officially left The American, with its football team becoming an FBS independent once the school joined the Big East. After a brief exploration period, The American elected not to add another team to rebalance divisions. Beginning with the 2020 season, divisions were eliminated and for the time being the championship game is be played by the two teams that achieved the best record in regular season conference play. When further conference realignments take effect in 2023–2024, division play may return.

Pre-championship game era

The 2013 and 2014 American Athletic Conference football champions were determined by the team(s) with the best conference record. There was no championship game held. In years when two or more teams tied in conference record, co-champions were declared.

Results
Below are the results from all AAC Championship Games played. The winning team appears in bold font, on a background of their primary team color. Rankings are from the AP Poll released prior to the game.

Results by team

 East Carolina, South Florida and SMU have yet to make an appearance in an AAC Football Championship Game.
 UConn never made an appearance in an AAC Football Championship Game prior to the move to FBS Independent status in 2020.

Game records

Source:

Selection criteria

Team selection
The two teams with the best winning percentage in conference play will play in the Championship Game. If there's a two-team tie for first place, both teams will play in the Championship Game. In the event that two teams are tied for second place, head-to head result would break the tie. If the two teams did not play, the team with higher CFP Rankings will be in the Championship game. If a team or teams lose in the final weekend of the Conference play to create a tie, and there are subsequent CFP rankings, those subsequent rankings break ties.

If regular season ends and the Championship Game is scheduled for the next Saturday, the following tiebreakers are used:
 if one of the tied teams wins in the final week it will be in the Championship. If that team loses, a composite average of selected computer rankings are used to determine participants.
 If both teams are ranked in the latest CFP Rankings, the higher ranked team that wins in the final weekend will be in the Championship.
 If neither of the tied teams ranked in the latest CFP Rankings win, a composite average of selected computer rankings are used to determine participants. 
 If no teams are ranked in the latest CFP Rankings rankings, a composite average of selected computer rankings are used to determine participants. 

The following procedures are used when there's a multiple team tie.
 Conference Records of tied teams in a mini round-robin
 The team with higher CFP Ranking; If a team or teams lose in the final weekend of the Conference season to create a tie, and there are subsequent CFP rankings, those subsequent rankings break ties.

If regular season ends and the Championship Game is scheduled for the next Saturday, the following tiebreakers are used to break multi-team ties:
 if the highest ranked team in the latest CFP Rankings wins in the final week it will be in the Championship. If that team loses, a composite average of selected computer rankings are used to break ties. 
 If there are multiple teams ranked in the latest CFP Rankings, the higher ranked team or teams that wins will be in the Championship.
 If neither of the tied teams are ranked in the latest CFP Rankings win, a composite average of selected computer rankings are used to break ties.  
 If no teams are ranked in the latest CFP Rankings ranked, a composite average of selected computer rankings are used to break ties.

Site selection
The team with the highest winning percentage in Conference play will host. If both participants are tied, Head-to-head is the tie breaker. If the two teams did not play, the team with the higher CFP Ranking will host. The latest CFP Rankings will be used to break ties. If a team or teams lose in the final weekend of the Conference season to create a tie, and there are subsequent CFP rankings, those subsequent rankings break ties.

If regular season ends and the Championship Game is scheduled for the next Saturday, the following tiebreakers are used:
 if one of the tied teams wins in the final week it will host. If that team loses, a composite average of selected computer rankings will be used to determine host.
 If both teams are ranked in the latest CFP Rankings multiple, the higher ranked team that wins in the final weekend will host.
 If neither of the tied teams ranked in the latest CFP Rankings win, a composite average of selected computer rankings are used to determine host. 
 If no teams are ranked in the latest CFP Rankings rankings, a composite average of selected computer rankings are used to determine host. 

*Note: If the number one seed is unable to host, the other team will host.

See also
 List of NCAA Division I FBS conference championship games

References

 
Recurring sporting events established in 2015
2015 establishments in the United States